1313 Berna, provisional designation , is a background asteroid and synchronous binary system from the Eunomian region in the central asteroid belt, approximately  in diameter. It was discovered on 24 August 1933, by Belgian astronomer Sylvain Arend at the Uccle Observatory in Belgium. The assumed S-type asteroid has a longer-than average rotation period of 25.5 hours and is likely elongated in shape. It was named for the Swiss capital of Bern. The discovery of an 11-kilometer-sized companion was announced in February 2004.

Orbit and classification 

According to modern HCM-analyses by Nesvorný, as well as by Milani and Knežević, Berna is a non-family asteroid from the main belt's background population.

Based on osculating Keplerian orbital elements, it is located in the region of the Eunomia family, a prominent family of stony asteroids. It orbits the Sun in the central asteroid belt at a distance of 2.1–3.2 AU once every 4 years and 4 months (1,584 days; semi-major axis of 2.66 AU). Its orbit has an eccentricity of 0.21 and an inclination of 13° with respect to the ecliptic. Its observation arc begins with its official discovery observation at Uccle.

Naming 

This minor planet was named after the Swiss capital city of Bern. The name was proposed by Sigmund Mauderli (1876–1962), astronomer and director of the Astronomical Institute at the University of Bern, after whom 1748 Mauderli is named. He computed the definitive orbit of the body, and also insisted to rename the minor planet to its current name, after it had been originally published as "Bernia". The official  was first mentioned in The Names of the Minor Planets by Paul Herget in 1955.

Physical characteristics

Lightcurve 

A network of astronomers at several observatories including Raoul Behrend at Geneva Observatory, Switzerland, obtained the so-far best rated rotational light-curve of Berna. Light-curve analysis gave a rotation period of  hours with a brightness variation of 0.28 magnitude. In November 2007, photometric observations at Cerro Tololo, Chile, using its 0.9-meter Prompt5 telescope in combination with the Spitzer Space Telescope gave a concurring period of 25.46 hours with an amplitude of 0.5 magnitude. Other light-curves were also obtained by several amateur astronomers giving a period of 6, 25.4 and 25.45 hours, respectively.

Asteroid moon 

In February 2004, a satellite orbiting the asteroid was discovered. The moon, designated S/2004 (1313) 1, measures about 11 kilometers in diameter and orbits Berna at a distance of 35 kilometer once every 25 hours and 28 minutes. Since the lightcurve is synchronized with the eclipse events, at least one body of the binary system rotates synchronously with the orbital motion. It was identified based on light-curve observations taken in February 2004 by several astronomers, including Raoul Behrend at Geneva Observatory, Stefano Sposetti, René Roy, Donald Pray, Christophe Demeautis, Daniel Matter, Alain Klotz and others. Although the IAUC was released on 23 February 2004, the announcement was already made on 12 February 2004. There are several hundreds of asteroids known to have satellites (also see :Category:Binary asteroids).

Diameter and albedo 

According to the surveys carried out by the Japanese Akari satellite, NASA's Spitzer Space Telescope and the Wide-field Infrared Survey Explorer with its subsequent NEOWISE mission, Berna measures between 13.12 and 19.96 kilometers in diameter and its surface has an albedo between 0.13 and 0.25. The Collaborative Asteroid Lightcurve Link assumes an albedo of 0.21 – derived from 15 Eunomia, the parent body of the Eunomia family – and calculates a diameter of 13.88 kilometers based on an absolute magnitude of 11.6.

Notes

References

External links 
 IAUC 8292
 Behrend 2005, Four new binary Minor Planets
 Asteroids with Satellites, Robert Johnston, johnstonsarchive.net
 Asteroid Lightcurve Database (LCDB), query form (info )
 Dictionary of Minor Planet Names, Google books
 Asteroids and comets rotation curves, CdR – Observatoire de Genève, Raoul Behrend
 Discovery Circumstances: Numbered Minor Planets (1)–(5000) – Minor Planet Center
 
 

001313
Discoveries by Sylvain Arend
Named minor planets
001313
19330824
20040206